This is a list of episodes for Season 15 of Late Night with Conan O'Brien, which aired from September 4, 2007 to August 29, 2008.

Series overview

Season 15

References 

Episodes (season 15)